Saint Evodius or Euodias (died circa 69) was an Early Christian bishop of Antioch, succeeding Saint Peter. He is regarded as one of the first identifiable Christians, and venerated as a saint.

Biography
Little is known of the life of Evodius. At the time, Antioch was an opulent and cosmopolitan city where both Hellenized Jews and pagans were influenced by monotheism. 
Saint Peter, having fled Jerusalem as a wanted criminal, came to the city, becoming the first bishop of Antioch and led the church there (Acts 12, Galatians 2:11) . 

Evodius was one of the 72 disciples of Christ. He eventually succeeded Peter as bishop of Antioch when Peter left for Rome.

Saint Evodius was bishop of Antioch until 66 AD, and was succeeded by Saint Ignatius of Antioch. Catholic tradition says it is likely that Saint Evodius died of natural causes, however, the Eastern Orthodox tradition holds that he was martyred under Emperor Nero in 66 AD. As one of the first pagans to come to the new church, he is venerated as a saint in the Roman Catholic Church, Eastern Orthodox Church, Oriental Orthodox Church, as well as the Assyrian Church of the East. His feast day is 6 May in the Catholic Church and 7 September in the Eastern Orthodox Church.

It has been claimed that in one of his many writings, Evodius asserts that the Virgin Mary gave birth to Jesus Christ, the Saviour, when she was fifteen. However, no known writings of Evodius survive today.

Notes

Seventy disciples
1st-century deaths
Patriarchs of Antioch
1st-century bishops in Roman Anatolia
Converts to Christianity from pagan religions
1st-century Christian saints
Saints from Roman Anatolia